The Kopeck is a 2002 Russian comedy film directed by Ivan Dykhovichny. The production design was by Vladimir Trapeznikov. The name refers to the soviet car VAZ-2101, popularly nicknamed a kopeck.

Plot 
The film shows the adventures of the legendary VAZ-2101, resuscitated by the hands of the master Bubuka.

Cast 
 Sergey Mazaev as Bubuka
 Andrey Krasko as Narrator
 Yury Tsurilo as Viktor
 Roman Madyanov as ormer KGB / Militiaman / Visa and Registration for Foreigners Office employee
 Aleksandra Kulikova
 Oleg Kovalov		
 Sergey Shnurov as Man in window
 Olga Dykhovichnaya as Tanya
 Elena Babenko
 Igor Artashonov

References

External links 
 

2002 films
2000s Russian-language films
Russian comedy films